The Hanging Rock Ponds are a set of ponds near Hanging Rock, a village along the Ohio River in western Lawrence County, Ohio, United States.  The ponds are the result of strip mining, or surface mining for iron ore or coal during the 1960s and 1970s. Hanging Rock Ponds have a total of 51 ponds, scattered throughout a 5,000 acre (20 km²) national reserve. This area is part of the Wayne National Forest, Ohio's only national forest. Fishing of these ponds is allowed and are regularly stocked with game fish ranging from catfish, bluegill, and bass.

This area has  of trail used for off-road vehicles, hiking, and mountain biking.

External links
Website

Bodies of water of Lawrence County, Ohio
Tourist attractions in Lawrence County, Ohio
Lakes of Ohio
Ponds of the United States